On 27 July 1980, Said Al Nasr, a Syria-born Palestinian, used grenades to attack a group of 40 Jewish children waiting with their families for a bus to take them to summer camp. One boy was killed and 20 other people were wounded in the attack. The attacker was convicted.

Attack
The attack took place outside the Agoudath Israel cultural centre in Antwerp. The group of children, aged 10 to 14, originating from Britain, France, the Netherlands, Austria, and Belgium, were accompanied by their families as they waited to board a bus to take them to a summer camp in the Ardennes hills of southern Belgium. The explosion killed one boy, 15-year-old Parisian David Kohane, and wounded 20, aged 8 to 27, eight of whom had to be hospitalized, including a 13-year-old Belgian girl with critical brain injuries and a pregnant woman. 2 young brothers Zevi and Motti Glejser aged 8 and 9 respectively were walking past at the time of the attack and were wounded and hospitalised.

The attacker was arrested after witnesses chased him down. In addition to the thrown grenades, he was carrying a pistol and "several magazines of ammunition" that had not used in the attack.

The attack was among a number of anti-Jewish attacks worldwide in the early 1980s.

Perpetrator

Al Nasr is a Syrian-Palestinian, was convicted in Belgium in 1980, for throwing two hand grenades into a group of Jewish children waiting for a bus in Antwerp on 27 July 1980. He was carrying a Moroccan passport at the time of his arrest.

In 1990, the jailed Al Nasr was "traded" for part of the Houtekins-Kets family, a Belgian-French family kidnapped in Libya—a demand of the Abu Nidal group—during the Silco incident.

References

Further reading

1980 attack
1980 murders in Belgium
20th-century attacks on synagogues and Jewish communal organizations
Abu Nidal attacks
Antisemitism in Belgium
Attacks on religious buildings and structures in Europe
1980 attack
Improvised explosive device bombings in 1980
Explosions in Belgium
Jewish Belgian history
Jews and Judaism in Antwerp
July 1980 crimes
July 1980 events in Europe
Palestinian terrorist incidents in Europe
Terrorist incidents in Belgium in 1980